Christianity is the dominant religion in Eswatini. The relative prevalence percentages vary by source. According to Pew Research, over 88% of the total 1.2 million population of Eswatini express Christianity to be their faith, over 0.2% express no affiliation. According to the US State Department religious freedom report of 2012, local religious leaders estimate that 90% of Eswatini's population is Christian, 2% are Muslim, while under 10% belong to other religious groups. According to the CIA World Factbook, the distribution is 40% Zionist, 20% Roman Catholic, other Christians (including Anglican, Methodist, Mormon, Jehovah's Witness) 30%, 2% Muslim and 8% other religions (including Baháʼí, Buddhist, Hindu, indigenous, Jewish). In other sources such as Clay Potts, the religious demographics are 80% Christian, and 20% Islam and Traditional Swazi religion.

Anglican, Protestant and indigenous African churches including African Zionist, and Roman Catholics constitute the majority of the Christians in the country. On 18 July 2012, Ellinah Wamukoya was elected Anglican Bishop of Eswatini; on 17 November 2012 she became the first woman to be consecrated as a bishop in Africa.

The Constitution of the Kingdom, which went into effect on February 8, 2006, provides for freedom of religion. The Government respects freedom of religion. As of 2012, there have been reports of societal discrimination based on religious affiliation, belief, or practice.

Christianity
The king of Eswatini, Mswati II invited Methodist Christian missionaries to his kingdom in 1825. The first church to be established in the country was the Methodist Wesleyan Mission was established in Mahamba in 1844. The Christian missions largely failed through 1881, and had few conversions to their credit. A larger presence of missionaries began in 1881 when members of the United Society arrived to establish the presence of the Church of England. Lutherans arrived in 1887 from Germany, and Methodists restarted their efforts in 1895 out of their Christian missions in South Africa.

A Gothic-style church, which was built in 1912, still stands in Mahamba, and is the oldest existing place of worship in the country.
A large Roman Catholic presence, including churches, schools, and other infrastructure, exists in the country. The country forms a single diocese – the Diocese of Manzini. The Zionist Churches, which blend Christianity and indigenous ancestral worship, and were developed in the early part of the 19th century, predominate in rural areas. Christian holidays such as Good Friday, Christmas, Ascension Day are part of the national holiday calendar.

The Christianity followed by Swazi people incorporates rituals, singing, dancing and iconography of the traditional Swazi religion. According to Sibongile Nxumalo, the Christian missionaries that ignored or misconstrued "the positive aspects of traditional beliefs, customs and institutions of Swazi society" have largely been unsuccessful. More successful missions have adopted a syncretic approach.

The Christian organizations of Eswatini have been closely involved in the politics of the country. The colonial era Swaziland League of African Churches has had a long relationship with the royalty of Eswatini, and held public ceremonies such as Easter on the behalf of the King. The Zionist churches celebrate the Good Friday over three days with singing and dancing. The sv:Eswatini Conference of Churches have historically attempted to be apolitical, but in 2004 they campaigned to make Christianity the state religion through a constitutional amendment, a move opposed by the King. The third politically influential Christian organization in Eswatini has been the Council of Eswatini Churches, established in 1976 as refugees flooded into Eswatini, and this group voiced views on Apartheid in South Africa and the ongoing civil war in nearby Mozambique. Their views contradicted the state's position, and the leaders of this new Council were then threatened with arrests and prison terms.

Swazi religion

The traditional Swazi religion recognizes a supreme God and creator, but more important are the spirits of ancestors. Swazi religion speaks of a creator known as Mvelincanti (he who was there from the beginning). Mvelincanti is too remote and so it is ancestral spirits emadloti which are more relevant in day-to-day life.  Beasts are slaughtered and beer was brewed to please (propitiate) the spirits, and ask for help. The rituals are performed at the level of family associated with birth, death and marriage.  Some Swazis blend these traditions with contemporary Christian practices.

Incwala

In the hierarchy of Swazi society, the king assumes the leadership position. The incwala ritual, which is performed annually, is considered a national religious event. The objectives of the event are to reflect the growth of the king, and to thank the ancestors for good harvests and to pray for good rain in the coming year. This event, which only takes place when there is a king, is the most sacred national event and all male Swazis are participant. The holiday for incwala depends on the phases of the moon, and is at the end of the six-week event.

Other religions

Followers of Islam, the Baháʼí Faith, Hinduism and Judaism are largely immigrants located in urban areas. According to the US State  department, Islam forms about 2% of the population, while 2% of the population is Muslim according to the CIA World Factbook, and the Official Government state it is less than 0.2%. The Muslims in Eswatini are formerly indentured workers who arrived from South Asia during the colonial era.

See also 

 History of the Jews in Eswatini
 Islam in Eswatini

References